Neobubastes is a genus of beetles in the family Buprestidae, containing the following species:

 Neobubastes aureocincta Blackburn, 1892
 Neobubastes flavivittata Carter, 1922
 Neobubastes nickerli (Obenberger, 1928)

References

Buprestidae genera